The Thánh Trần worship (tín ngưỡng Đức Thánh Trần) is a spiritual practice in Vietnamese folk religion associated with the spirit of historical general Trần Hưng Đạo, who repulsed several invasions by the Mongol Empire and the Yuan dynasty. The shrines are sometimes collectively called Trần Triều, literally "Trần dynasty".

Mediumship with the spirit of Thánh Trần is part of votive dance lên đồng mediumship and is particularly associated with Đạo Mẫu (道母), mother goddess worship. Mediums are mainly female, possession of a male by the spirit is viewed as unusual.

References

Vietnamese mythology
Vietnamese folk religion